Keandre Gary Cook (born May 1, 1997) is an American professional basketball player for MZT Skopje of the Macedonian League. He played college basketball at Odessa College and Missouri State.

High school career
Cook attended Northwestern High School in Baltimore, Maryland for three years, joining the junior varsity basketball team as a freshman. He joined the varsity team as a sophomore and averaged 21 points per game as a junior. Prior to his senior season, Cook transferred to Edmondson-Westside High School. He averaged 19 points per game, helping the team finish 28–3. Cook committed to Odessa College over Midland College and Panola College, among other junior colleges.

College career
As a freshman at Odessa College, Cook averaged 4.7 points and 1.8 rebounds per game off the bench. He averaged 15 points and 5.4 rebounds per game as a sophomore. Cook was ranked the No. 76 player in his class by JucoRecruiting.com. He transferred to Missouri State over offers from Louisiana Tech and New Mexico State. He scored at least 20 points in four of his first five games for the Bears. Cook was named Missouri Valley Conference player of the week on January 28, 2019, and twice earned newcomer of the week honors. As a junior, he averaged 12.8 points and 4.3 rebounds per game. Cook was named to the Third Team All-Missouri Valley Conference as well as the All-Newcomer Team. Coming into his senior season, Cook was named to the preseason second team all-conference and established himself as a leader on the team. On November 10, 2019, he scored a career-high 31 points shooting 6-of-7 from three-point range in a 59–50 win over Alabama State. Cook was issued a technical foul for flopping with under a minute remaining in a game against Xavier on November 16, resulting in a loss for Missouri State. He averaged 14.9 points and 4.6 rebounds per game as a senior, earning Second Team All-Missouri Valley Conference honors.

Professional career
After going undrafted in the 2020 NBA draft, Cook signed with the Charlotte Hornets. He was waived at the end of training camp, but added to the roster of their NBA G League affiliate, the Greensboro Swarm. Cook averaged 1.6 points and 1.6 rebounds per game. On June 25, 2021, Cook signed with Szedeák of the Hungarian Nemzeti Bajnokság I/A.

On July 13, 2022, he has signed with ADA Blois Basket 41 of the LNB Pro A.

References

External links
Missouri State Bears bio
Odessa Wranglers bio

1997 births
Living people
ADA Blois Basket 41 players
American expatriate basketball people in Hungary
American men's basketball players
Basketball players from Baltimore
Greensboro Swarm players
Missouri State Bears basketball players
Odessa Wranglers men's basketball players
Shooting guards
SZTE-Szedeák players